Harrah's Reno is a closed casino hotel in downtown Reno, Nevada. It is owned by CAI Investments, which plans to renovate the building as a mixed-use development named Reno City Center.

It is credited for being the first property of the Harrah's casino chain, founded by William F. Harrah.

History
William F. Harrah opened his first bingo parlor on October 29, 1937, but by December 1937, that parlor was closed. Harrah then spent the winter raising money and re-opened his casino, now called the Heart Tango. The Heart Tango location was between Virginia and Center streets, in the heart of the Reno casino action. Over time, Harrah slowly acquired neighboring casinos adjacent to his Virginia Street casino. Harrah slowly built his operation.

In 1968, Harrah acquired The Reno Golden Hotel and contracted noted casino architect Martin Stern Jr. to create and construct a luxury 24–story hotel tower to build atop the bones of the former Grand Hotel. The tower opened on October 10, 1969. In 1981, a 100-room tower was added to the existing 24-story tower by the new owners Holiday Inn.

Harrah’s expanded from their Virginia Street “Blackout Bar” location sideways in 1956 when Pick Hobson’s Frontier Club next door was acquired. Gaming space included the buildings across Lincoln Alley, where the 1969 hotel tower was added, and then the 1978 expansion across Center Street accessed via a two-story high airway. 

Once the Center Street casino opened, Harrah’s had more than 2,000 slot machines on their combined three casino floors. In 1985 the properties boasted 105 table games, a 12-table poker room, and a sportsbook.
The block where Harrah’s first Tango club opened along Virginia Street once housed a dozen different casinos, including famous properties like the Bank Club and Harold’s Club. As those casinos closed, Harrah’s expanded their operations or razed the old clubs to make way for parking, meeting space, and open outdoor areas.

Harrah's had a showroom that hosted the same top headliners as those who appeared in Las Vegas, such as Joan Rivers, Smothers Brothers, Merle Haggard, Frank Sinatra, Wayne Newton, Captain and Tennille and Mitzi Gaynor. In 1991, after the death of Sammy Davis Jr., the Headliner Room name was changed to Sammy's Showroom. Davis had performed at Harrah's regularly and was the opening night act in the Headliner Room. Sammy's Showroom opened with a dual headliner and revue acts. Over the years, Sammy's Showroom was switched to a revue show-only policy. Headliners in the first years of the re-christened Sammy's Showroom included Vic Damone, Tony Bennett, Rich Little, Phyllis Diller, Marilyn McCoo and Norm Crosby. The last headliner to appear in Sammy's Showroom was Gordie Brown in 2004.

In 1995, Harrah's Entertainment was spun off from Promus Hotel Company (formerly Holiday Inn) and built the world's largest Hampton Inn, one of its signature hotel brands, next door to the Reno hotel. The Reno Hampton Inn hotel opened in November 1995. The Hampton Inn at Harrah's Reno was connected to the casino floor and included its own hotel lobby, valet and meeting facilities. During the Reno Truckee River flood of 1997, both the Hampton Inn and Harrah's had to be closed due to water damage. In 1999, the Promus Company was sold to the Hilton Hotels Corporation. Harrah's acquired the 26-story Hampton addition and made that hotel a seamless part of Harrah's, adding 400 rooms to its room count. In 1999, Harrah's purchased the closed older casinos of the Nevada Club and Harold's Club and soon imploded both aging casinos to make room for a grand outdoor entertainment venue, called The Plaza. Opened in 2000 as a concert venue, the first year shows included Ray Charles, KC and the Sunshine Band and Chuck Berry. The VIP seats in the Plaza were given to casino guests and also sold. The area also had free seating. Concerts could be heard all along Virginia Street. Harrah's remodeled the East Tower (formerly called the Hampton Inn) in 2003 and the original West Tower from 2005 to 2006. Harrah's has left the famed Harrah's Steak House, its most recognizable restaurant that founder Harrah built on May 26, 1967, virtually untouched. Major interior casino and meeting room renovations took place in 1995, 1999 and 2006. The Carvings Buffet (formerly Fresh Square Market Buffet) was opened on February 24, 2006, after it was closed in August 2005 for renovations, which cost $6 million dollars to renovate the buffet restaurant.

In early 2011, hotel management decided to invest in certain worn areas of the hotel property to refurbish them. Starting in late 2010, executive management decided to return to the use of "wall-wash" exterior lighting to bathe the hotel towers in bright purple, the official color of the Harrah's brand. In February 2011, it closed its age-old Cafe' Napa coffee shop which was opened in June 1999 and was replaced with a Hash House a go go restaurant.

On October 6, 2017, ownership of the Harrah's Reno property was transferred to Vici Properties as part of a corporate spin-off and it was leased back to Caesars Entertainment.

In January 2020, Caesars and Vici announced that they would sell Harrah's Reno to CAI Investments, a Las Vegas-based real estate firm. CAI intended to close the property and convert it into a non-gaming hotel, along with mixed-use development. During the COVID-19 pandemic, Harrah's Reno was among businesses that were ordered by Governor Steve Sisolak to close on March 17, 2020, to prevent the spread of the virus. In June 2020, Caesars announced that it would not reopen Harrah's Reno. The sale was finalized in September, with Vici receiving 75 percent of the $41.5 million sale price, and Caesars receiving the other 25 percent.  CAI will rename the property Reno City Center. It will include 540 apartments.

See also

References

External links
 

1937 establishments in Nevada
2020 disestablishments in Nevada
Harrah's Entertainment
Casino hotels
Casinos completed in 1937
Casinos in Reno, Nevada
Defunct casinos in Nevada
Hotel buildings completed in 1937
Hotel buildings completed in 1969
Hotel buildings completed in 1981
Hotel buildings completed in 1995
Hotel buildings completed in 1999
Hotels established in 1937
Hotels disestablished in 2020
Hotels in Reno, Nevada
Defunct hotels in Nevada
Resorts in Nevada